Ronald Arthur Hadley (born November 9, 1963) is a former professional football player, a linebacker with the NFL's San Francisco 49ers in 1987 and 1988, when the 49ers won Super Bowl XXIII.

Hadley attended the University of Washington from 1982–86, and was selected by the New York Jets in the 5th round of the 1986 NFL Draft, the 132nd overall 

He is a 1982 graduate of Boise High School, where he was the IHSAA A-1 Player of the Year in his senior season. He was a starter on both defense and offense (defensive end and tight end), and led the Boise Braves to the A-1 state championship as a junior and the state finals as a senior.

Post-NFL Career
Hadley is a Director of Quality with Boeing Commercial Airplanes in Everett, Wash.

References

External links
 

People from Caldwell, Idaho
San Francisco 49ers players
Washington Huskies football players
Sportspeople from Boise, Idaho
Players of American football from Idaho
1963 births
Living people
National Football League replacement players